High Performance Storage System (HPSS) is a flexible, scalable, policy-based Hierarchical Storage Management product developed by the HPSS Collaboration.  It provides scalable hierarchical storage management (HSM), archive, and file system services using cluster, LAN and SAN technologies to aggregate the capacity and performance of many computers, disks, disk systems, tape drives and tape libraries.

Architecture 
HPSS supports a variety of methods for accessing and creating data.  Among them are support for FTP, parallel FTP, FUSE (Linux), as well as a robust client API with support for parallel I/O.

As of version 7.5, HPSS has full support on Linux.  The HPSS client API is supported on AIX, Linux, and Solaris.

The implementation is built around IBM's Db2, a scalable relational database management system.

The HPSS Collaboration 
The collaboration which produced HPSS began in the fall of 1992, and involved IBM's Houston Global Services and five United States Department of Energy (DOE) National Laboratories (Lawrence Berkeley, Lawrence Livermore, Los Alamos, Oak Ridge, and Sandia).  At that time, the DOE national laboratory and IBM HPSS design team recognized there would be a data storage explosion driven by computing power rising to teraops/petaops requiring data stored in HSMs to rise to petabytes and beyond, data transfer rates with the HSM to rise to gigabytes/s and higher, and daily throughput with a HSM in 10s of terabytes/day. Therefore, the collaboration set out to design and deploy a system that would scale by a factor of 1,000 or more and evolve from the base above toward these expected targets and beyond.

The HPSS collaboration is based on the premise that no single organization has the experience and resources to meet all the challenges represented by the growing imbalance between computing power and data collection capabilities, and storage system I/O, capacity, and functionality. Over twenty organizations worldwide including industry, US Department of Energy (DOE), other federal laboratories, universities, National Science Foundation (NSF) supercomputer centers, French Commissariat a l'Energie Atomique (CEA), and Gleicher Enterprises have contributed to various aspects of this effort.

As of 2022, the primary HPSS development team consists of:
 IBM Global Business Services (Houston, TX)
 Los Alamos National Laboratory (Los Alamos, NM)
 Lawrence Livermore National Laboratory (Livermore, CA)
 Lawrence Berkeley National Energy Research Scientific Computing Center (Berkeley, CA)
 Oak Ridge National Laboratory (Oak Ridge, TN)
 Sandia National Laboratory (Albuquerque, NM)

Notable achievements 

 Two of the larger HPSS sites, ECMWF and UK Met Office, had 217 and 99 petabytes of data stored within a single HPSS instance and namespace as of December 7, 2016.
 On November 14, 2007, the San Diego Supercomputer Center along with IBM, DataDirect, and Brocade demonstrated a "Billion File" test which successfully backed up a billion files from GPFS into HPSS.
 In May 2013 a 380 Petabyte HPSS installation entered service at the National Center for Supercomputing Applications (NCSA) at the University of Illinois at Urbana-Champaign.

References 

IBM storage devices
Storage software